Henry Burgess (5 May 1879 – 16 April 1964) was an English cricketer. Burgess was a right-handed batsman who bowled right-arm fast. He was born at Carlton Curlieu, Leicestershire.

Burgess made his first-class debut for Leicestershire against Essex at the County Ground, Leyton in the 1900 County Championship. He made seven further first-class appearances for the county, the last of which came against Surrey at Aylestone Road, Leicester in the 1902 County Championship. In his eight first-class matches for Leicestershire, he took 11 wickets at an average of 47.63, with best figures of 3/106. A tailend batsman, he scored a total of 53 runs at a batting average of 5.30, with a high score of 20. He later made a single first-class appearance for Northamptonshire in the 1905 County Championship against Sussex at the County Ground, Northampton.

He died at Middleton, Northamptonshire on 16 April 1964. His brother John Burgess and nephew Robert Fetherstonhaugh both played first-class cricket.

References

External links
Henry Burgess at Cricinfo
Henry Burgess at CricketArchive

1879 births
1964 deaths
People from Harborough District
Cricketers from Leicestershire
English cricketers
Leicestershire cricketers
Northamptonshire cricketers